Samre may refer to:

 Pear people, also known as Samre people
 Samre language, spoken by the Samre people
 Samre (woreda), one of the woredas in the Tigray Region of Ethiopia
 Samre, Ethiopia, a town in northern Ethiopia
 Samre, Bangkok, a subdistrict and neighbourhood in Thon Buri District, Bangkok, Thailand

Language and nationality disambiguation pages